Hegyvidék (literally "Highlands", or "Mountain-land") is the official name of the XII district of Budapest, capital of Hungary. It is a region of Buda, on the west bank of river Danube.

Geography 

Being the only district in Buda which has not got a connection to the river Danube, it lies on the green, hilly suburban area of Budapest. It borders 2nd district to the north, the 1st district (Castle district and Gellérthegy) to the east and 11th district (Kelenföld and Sashegy) to the south.  Its western border marks the border of the whole city as well. Hegyvidék is said to be the lung of Budapest, as it gives place to many of the untouched green forests of the city and it also houses the highest hill of the entire urban area, János Hill (527 m above sea level).

Neighbourhoods 
The district lies on 26.7 square kilometers and has around 75 thousand inhabitants. It has several neighbourhoods: Budakeszierdő, Csillebérc, Farkasrét, Farkasvölgy, Istenhegy, János Hill, Kissvábhegy, Krisztinaváros, Kútvölgy, Magasút, Mártonhegy, Németvölgy, Orbánhegy, Sashegy, Svábhegy, Széchenyihegy, Virányos, Zugliget.

List of mayors

Twin towns 
Hegyvidék is twinned with:
  Odorheiu Secuiesc, Romania
  Watermael-Boitsfort, Belgium

Gallery

See also 
 List of districts in Budapest

References

External links 

 Official Homepage (In Hungarian)
 Hegyvidék.hu
 Aerial photographs of Hegyvidék